The 1992 Supercopa Libertadores Finals was a two-legged football series to determine the winner of the 1992 Supercopa Libertadores. The finals were contested by Brazilian Cruzeiro Esporte Clube and Argentine side Racing Club de Avellaneda, which met again in a Supercopa final after their first encounter in 1988.

In the first leg, held in Mineirão in Belo Horizonte, Cruzeiro easily defeated Racing 4–0. The second leg was held in Estadio Presidente Perón in Avellaneda, where Racing beat Cruzeiro 1–0. As both teams equaled on points, Cruzeiro won the series 4–1 on aggregate, taking revenge from Racing and achieving their first Supercopa Libertadores trophy.

Qualified teams

Venues

Match details

First leg

Second leg

References

1
s
s
Supercopa Libertadores Finals
Football in Avellaneda